Théobald Dillon (1745, Dublin – April 29th, 1792, near Lille) was count of Dillon and an Irish-born general in the French army. He was a distant cousin of general Arthur Dillon (who also had a brother named Theobald).

He entered Dillon's Regiment as a cadet in 1761, gradually rose to be lieutenant-colonel (1780), took part in the Capture of Grenada (1779) and the siege of Savannah in 1779, was appointed a knight of St. Louis in 1781, was authorised to wear the Order of Cincinnatus in 1785, and was awarded a pension of 1,500 francs in 1786. He became brigadier-general in 1791.

On 29 April 1792, following the loss of a skirmish with Austrian forces, Dillon was murdered by his own men outside the city of Lille.  The troops apparently believed that their defeat by the Austrians was the result of a conspiracy on the part of Dillon, whom they called a "traitor and aristocrat."

References 

1745 births
1792 deaths
French people of Irish descent
Military leaders of the French Revolutionary Wars
Military personnel from Dublin (city)
Knights of the Order of Saint Louis
French military personnel of the American Revolutionary War